Timothy T. Cronin (June 27, 1884 – September 20, 1955) was the United States Attorney for the Eastern District of Wisconsin.

Biography
Cronin was born to Timothy and Mary (Swanson) Cronin on June 27, 1884, in Chicago, Illinois. He later moved with his family to Oconomowoc, Wisconsin, and attended what later became the Wisconsin State College of Milwaukee and served as a high school principal in Mukwonago, Wisconsin, before his graduation from the University of Wisconsin Law School in 1914. During World War I, he served in the United States Army. A Roman Catholic, Cronin was a member of the Knights of Columbus and the Society of the Holy Name.

On November 9, 1916, Cronin married Maud F. Clohisy. They had two children. He died in Oconomowoc on September 20, 1955, due to complications from a myocardial infarction and a stroke.

Legal and political career
Cronin opened a private practice in Oconomowoc after graduation from law school. He was U.S. Attorney from 1944 to 1955 before briefly returning to private practice until his death. Additionally, he was city attorney and a member of the school board of Oconomowoc.

References

External links
The Political Graveyard

Lawyers from Chicago
Politicians from Chicago
People from Oconomowoc, Wisconsin
Catholics from Wisconsin
United States Attorneys for the Eastern District of Wisconsin
Wisconsin city attorneys
School board members in Wisconsin
Military personnel from Wisconsin
United States Army personnel of World War I
Schoolteachers from Wisconsin
University of Wisconsin–Milwaukee alumni
University of Wisconsin Law School alumni
1884 births
1955 deaths
Catholics from Illinois
People from Mukwonago, Wisconsin
20th-century American educators
Educators from Illinois
20th-century American lawyers
American school principals